HIV screening in the United States is the use of tests to determine HIV status of individuals, as a part of general public health strategies to reduce the rate of transmission of HIV/AIDS in the United States and to lead to treatment of HIV positive individuals. As a public health measure, widespread testing is advocated by some.  Programs such as the National HIV Testing Day on June 27 are used to promote it.  The New England Journal of Medicine endorsed widespread testing in 2013.  There are special challenges in reaching teenagers. Numerous areas have offered free and rapid HIV testing to the public, including Atlanta, Georgia on World AIDS Day, December 1.

National HIV Testing Day
The National HIV Testing Day on June 27 is organized annually by the U.S. Department of Health and Human Service's AIDS.GOV program and the Centers for Disease Control and Prevention’s National Center for HIV/AIDS, Viral Hepatitis, STD, and TB Prevention  Walgreens is one corporate sponsor, and offers free HIV testing on that day at a number of its drugstore locations (140 cities in 2014).

The day has been an event since 1995, when it was organized by the National Association of People with AIDS (NAPWA).

Over-the-counter testing
In 2012 the U.S. Food and Drug Administration announced that it had approved the first, over-the-counter (OTC) sale of home HIV test kits that do not require sending sample to a lab.
The Pennsylvania-based Orasure Company holds the patent and monopoly on the oral swab technology. The FDA guidelines state that anyone 17 years of age can purchase a kit without medical training or requirement to disclose results to local medical authorities. Neither a doctor's prescription nor a parent's permission is required.

See also
 World AIDS Day, December 1

References 

HIV/AIDS in the United States
Infectious disease blood tests